Mansur-e Aqai Rural District is a rural district (dehestan) in Shahu District, Ravansar County, Kermanshah Province, Iran. At the 2006 census, its population was 5,088, in 1,150 families. The rural district has 7 villages.

References 

Rural Districts of Kermanshah Province
Ravansar County